Pooja Ramachandran is an Indian actress, VJ and model. After her studies, she participated in beauty pageants, winning the 'Miss Coimbatore 2004' title and was the runner up for Miss Kerala 2005. She then went on to become a VJ at SS Music before venturing into acting. She entered as a wild card contestant in the Telugu reality TV show Bigg Boss Telugu 2.

Early life

Pooja Ramachandran is the daughter of an army officer. She studied visual communication at the CSI Bishop Appasamy College of Arts and Science in Coimbatore.

Career

Pooja first featured in an advertisement when she was eight. Before the Miss Coimbatore title she had already done some assignments in Coimbatore and Bangalore. Pooja had also played a cameo in the Jayaram-Soundarya starrer Yathrakarude Sradhakku.

In February 2006, Pooja became a VJ at SS Music after she, along with Anuj Gurwara, Purnima Maudgil and Gibran, were selected as the winners out of 3000 contestants in SS Music's pan-India talent hunt show VJ Factor 2. She hosted shows like PCO, Gana Bajaana, Connect and Cinema Central. Later she hosted the show Ulagam Muzhuthum Paranthu Paranthu on Jaya TV. She was also a contestant in Anu Alavum Bayamillai becoming the winner of the first season, and acted in the thriller serial Kanchana, both on STAR Vijay.

After 2012, Pooja became a full-time actress, signing feature films across Tamil, Telugu and Malayalam industries. She was seen in minor roles in the romantic comedy Kadhalil Sodhappuvadhu Yeppadi, its Telugu version Love Failure and the thriller Pizza in 2012. The following year, she played supporting roles in the Telugu film Swamy Ra Ra and the Malayalam films Lucky Star and D Company. With regard to her performance in Swamy Ra Ra, Sify called her "perfect", Her first 2014 release, Adavi Kaachina Vennela, saw her playing a homemaker.

Pooja completed filming for the romantic drama Ore Nyabagam, which is reportedly India's first 2D high frame rate film. She is further more working on the suspense thriller Andhaghaaram, the horror-comedy Muni 3: Ganga, the romantic comedy Nanbenda and Swamy Ra Ra'''s Tamil remake Saamiyattam'', while she also has been signed for two Telugu films.

 She married VJ Craig in 2010 but divorced him in 2017. She married actor John Kokken on 15 April 2019.

Filmography

References

External links
 

Actresses from Bangalore
Actresses in Tamil cinema
Living people
Year of birth missing (living people)
Actresses in Telugu cinema
Indian VJs (media personalities)
Actresses in Malayalam cinema
Indian film actresses
21st-century Indian actresses
Bigg Boss (Telugu TV series) contestants